Yarburgh is a village and civil parish in the East Lindsey district of Lincolnshire, England, and situated approximately  north-east from the town of Louth.

The name 'Yarburgh' means 'fortification made of earth'.

St John the Baptist's Church in Yarburgh dates from at least the 13th century, although it was rebuilt after a fire in 1405 and restored in 1855. It is now in the care of The Churches Conservation Trust.

References

External links

Villages in Lincolnshire
Civil parishes in Lincolnshire
East Lindsey District